Trivial Act is a progressive metal band from Arendal, Norway. Their influences are based on progressive metal greats such as Dream Theater, Fates Warning, Queensrÿche and Voivod and traditional metal legends Judas Priest and Iron Maiden.

History 
Trivial Act was formed in 1993 by the guitarists B. Andreassen and H. Salvesen in Arendal, Norway. On October 27, 1997, they released Mindscape which was praised in 2006 as "a classic release in Norwegian Metal" by Scream magazine. A month later, Erik Wroldsen left the band for personal reasons and was later replaced by the drummer Stian Kristoffersen of Pagan's Mind. A year later, Sven Ole Heggedal left the band for the same reasons and replacing him was bass guitarist Steinar Krokmo, also of Pagan's Mind. A month after Steinar joined, Håkon Salvesen left the band. In 2001, they recorded a 3-song demo, Thoughts in Lyrics, and then temporarily broke up. After a long break, the band started recording the follow-up to Mind Scape. In November 2008, Kim Isaksen left and the band is currently searching for a new vocalist to replace him.

Band members 
 Bjørn Andreassen – guitar
 Håkon Salvesen – guitar

Former members 
 Steinar Krokmo – bass guitar
 Stian Lindaas Kristoffersen|Stian Kristoffersen – drums
 Erik Wroldsen – drums
 Svend Ole Heggedal – bass guitar
 Kim Werner Isaksen

Discography 
 Mindscape - album, Face Front, 1997

References

External links 
 Official website under construction
 Trivial Act at MySpace
 An article
 An article
 An article
 An article
 An article
 An article
 An article

Norwegian progressive metal musical groups
Musical groups established in 1993
1993 establishments in Norway
Musical groups from Arendal